Cape Lopatka is the southernmost point of Kamchatka Peninsula, Russia, with the rural locality of Semenovka at its southernmost point. Cape Lopatka also serves as the northernmost area of habitation by the Ainu people.

Climate 
In spite of its temperate latitude, the powerful Oyashio Current on the western flank of the Aleutian Low gives Lopatka a chilly and very wet polar climate  that borders extremely closely on subarctic climate (Köppen Dfc/ET), for which is just qualifies due to its  August means, which in low-lying areas would be expected only at latitudes about 20 degrees or  further north. However, the extreme winds make it feel much colder. Summers are mild, but extraordinarily cloudy with annual sunshine hours about 1,050 per year, which is comparable to Reykjavík or the extremely foggy Sichuan Basin. Sunshine is actually most likely in the wettest months of September and October when the heavy rain removes the low-level fog, but clear days are extremely rare at any time of year. As of 2019, this is still yet to result in any high above .

References

Landforms of Kamchatka Krai
Lopatka
Ainu geography